The 2018 season was Kedah's 10th season in the Malaysia Super League since its inception in 2004. They also participated in Malaysia FA Cup and Malaysia Cup.

Key Events

Pre-season
On 3 December 2017, it was reported that two Kedah footballers & coach were alleged match fixing and have their statement taken by the police. This was after 6 Kedah footballers and coach Nidzam Adzha Yusoff after were accused by a fan on Facebook of throwing the Malaysia Cup final match on Nov 4.

On 11 December 2017, it was announced that former Kedah assistant head coach Ramon Marcote has returned to the side for the 2018 season, this time as the head coach.

First team squad

Transfers

In
1st leg

2nd leg

Out
1st leg

2nd leg

Friendlies

Pre-season and friendlies

Suramadu Super Cup 2018

Competitions

Malaysia Super League

League table

Results by matchday

Results summary

Matches

The fixtures for the 2018 Malaysia Super League season were announced on 11 January 2018.

Malaysia FA Cup

Malaysia Cup

Group stage

Statistics

Appearances and goals

Clean sheets

References

Kedah Darul Aman F.C.
Kedah Darul Aman F.C. seasons
Malaysian football clubs 2018 season